February Album Writing Month or FAWM is an annual global songwriting challenge. The goal is to compose 14 original musical works during the month of February, roughly one song every other day. The website provides participants, called "fawmers," with weekly songwriting challenges and an online community, including ability to comment on others' work as well as forums for sharing ideas, forming collaborations, overcoming writer's block, or information on where local songwriting meetups. As of 2022, fawmers have collectively written 225,000 songs.

History 

FAWM began in February 2004 as a personal project of singer-songwriter Burr Settles, who was inspired after completing a short novel for NaNoWriMo. He recruited three friends to join him in attempting to compose 14 new songs during the month. Since all four so-called "fawmers" lived in different time zones, they used a blog to track their progress and encourage one another. Each of them met or surpassed the 14-song goal, with 66 songs total.

Due to expressed interest from songwriters who stumbled upon the FAWM 2004 archive, the challenge was opened up to the public in February 2005 at FAWM.ORG, where the challenge has remained since. Registered users may post demo recordings of their new songs to keep track of their progress and elicit feedback.

In 2008, because of a Leap Year (29 Days), the ante was upped to 14½ songs — the extra half-song being a songwriting collaboration. In the years since, collaborative songwriting has become a staple of the FAWM community.

From 2005 to 2010, the project also produced a compilation CD series, entitled 14 Songs In 28 Days. Each album documents the corresponding year's FAWM event, and releases were met with critical praise from indie-music magazines such as Wonkavision and PopMatters.

Genres 

Fawmers compose music of all genres and styles, though the most prevalent are folk, indie rock, and singer-songwriter. In order to spur creativity and work outside of ruts, fawmers periodically create new "genres" and challenges, such as:
 Strangle Disco - Dance music usually involving classical music samples
 Crucio - A songwriting game similar to tag
 Exquisite Corpse - A songwriting equivalent of the classic game, wherein one person writes 60 seconds of a song, then passes only the last ten seconds to the next person, who continues the song, and so on.
 Morphing - A songwriting equivalent of the classic game Telephone. Each person in the songwriting chain must write a song based on the previous song, by changing half of it.
 Explore the core - Recording several highly different versions of the same lyrics and chords.
 Feasting - Writing and recording many songs in one session in a short space of time.
 Auntie Sin - Someone writes the antithesis of the first song in the chain, then the next person writes a synthesis of the first two songs, then the next person writes the antithesis of the third song, then the next person writes a synthesis of songs three and four, and so on.
 Skirmish - A title/prompt is announced and songwriters must immediately write a song in the space of the next hour.
 Fake-It Challenge - Participants create a melody for a set of lyrics and accompanying chords (inspired by fake books). 
 Slothcore - Ambient music at a very slow tempo; in 2021, fawmers created and released on Bandcamp an album of slothcore music, with proceeds going to sloth conservation efforts.

FAWMers used to keep in contact with each other throughout the year at companion website, www.fawmers.com but it no longer exists. Instead, as of 2022 the fawm.org site is being used throughout the year, both for FAWM and for the summer challenge 50/90 (50 songs in 90 days). The site is wiped in between challenges, so as to get a fresh start each time.

In Popular Culture 

Many fawmers are professional or semi-professional musicians whose FAWM-penned songs have received considerable attention.

A notable example is a three-way collaboration between Jefferson Pitcher, Christian Kiefer, and Matthew Gerken (of the band Nice Monster), who each wrote songs about 14 U.S. presidencies for FAWM 2006 (for a total of 42, saving the then-current President Bush for a later collaboration). The result, titled  Of Great and Mortal Men: 43 Songs for 43 U.S. Presidencies  was released as a triple-CD set during the 2008 election season to critical acclaim.

Another notable collaboration is the song "Walkthrough" by fawmers Debs and Errol written during FAWM 2009 and released on their 2012 album Songs in the Key of Geek. This geek rock song essentially outlines the steps to win the classic text-based computer game Zork set to ambient alternative rock music. It went viral on the Internet and enjoys a certain notoriety among computer game enthusiasts.

On November 17, 2020, The Tonight Show Starring Jimmy Fallon ridiculed the song "Cold Wind, Warm Breeze, Hot Girls, Cool Dudes" by fawmer Michael Gutierrez-May as part of its "Do Not Play" segment. The song was part of a skirmish (see above) during that year's FAWM, meant only as songwriting exercise, not necessarily intended for official public release. Fallon did not ask permission and has not released an apology, although the video of the segment has since been removed from YouTube.

Related projects 

The FAWM Challenge is popular among participants in other timed artistic challenges, such as NaNoWriMo, Songfight, 50 Songs in 90 Days, Sounds of the Weak, National Solo Album Month (NaSoAlMo) and Album-a-Day. FAWM was also the model inspiration for the RPM Challenge, which encourages its participants to record a 10-song album.

References

External links 
 FAWM.ORG Official Website
 CD Review of 14 Songs In 28 Days (Vol. 2) — PopMatters
 Fawmers - website for songwriters to discuss FAWM during the offseason (when fawm.org is offline)

DIY culture
February events
February observances
Month-long observances
Music competitions
Music websites
Songwriting competitions